Cube TV（Hangul: 큐브TV）was established on July 1, 2015, is a channel launched by iHQ's media division and Cube Entertainment, and is in charge of channel operation in iHQ Media Division and contents production and supply at Cube Entertainment. Through the combination of broadcasters and entertainment companies, Cube TV aims to globalize the channels in line with the current of the Korean Wave, which is expanding its market both domestically and globally by producing stable and consistently excellent contents in promoting K-pop culture through variety shows, fansign meetings and online drama.

The channel includes BtoB's Btob Show, CLC's Seongdong-gu Resident, Pentagon's Pentagon maker, Triple H's Triple H Fun Agency, online drama Spark and more.

Development
In 2018, Cube Entertainment joined with Kiswe Mobile to create an application of 12 multi-view camera, "Cube TV Hangtime". This is an interactive mobile video which audience can interact with the artist. On June 16, Cube TV Hangtime app aired a four-hour-long of "United Cube Concert – One" for the audience who were unable to attend the concert.

For Cube Tv's 5th anniversary, they held an event of 'Uploading the 5th Anniversary Channel Logo SNS Certification Shot' and announced two original programs scheduled to air in July, (G)I-dle's Never Ending Neverland and All That Cube.

Programs

Current airing

 Starting today 
 JOB Dragon 20 
 Seonho's Everyday 
 #Hashtalk 
 U & Cube Festival 2019 in Japan  
 PRISM LOG 
 (G)I-dle: Little but Certain Happiness 
 What Is Hui Wearing Today? 
 Pentagon's TNL (Thursday Night Live)
 Lovely 95s 
 Lovely 95s Special 
 Wassup Showcase 
 CLC Yeeun'S Sweet Radio 
 CLC in Seongdong-gu 
 2018 BtoB Time – This Is Us  
 Doom-CLC, Doodoom-CLC 
 BtoB's HA.DA.BANG 
 CLC's Cheat Key 
 PENTORY 
 CUBE Bang 
 BtoB: Beatcom  
 (G)I-dle: I-Talk 
 Pentagon: Just Do It Yo!  
 If You Stop Now, There Will Be No Spotlight 
 United Cube Concert – One 
 Level Up  
 BTOB: Conti-NEW 
 Pentagon Mini Concert Tentastic Vol.5 - Miracle 
 2019 Hong Kong Asian Music Festival 
 2017 BtoB Time – Our Concert  
 Rich Man 
 Single Wife 
 B.A.P 오지GO 지리GO (Untact Life) 
 The Friends in Adriatic Sea 
 Triple H Fun Agency 
 Hashtag CUBE 
 2017 BtoB Time  
 Pentagon 1st showcase in Japan  
 2PM Wild Beat in Australia 
 2016 The Beautiful Show 
 Pentagon Mini Concert Tentastic Vol.1 - Love 
 The Miracle 
 Tong Memories 
 Star News 
 Something About 1 Percent 
 I learn 
 Gourmet Road 
 Spark 
 The Friends In Costa Rica  
 Reform Show 
 Hashtag Cube: B2B 
 2015 Born to Beat Time 
 BtoB 1st concert: Hello Melody 
 Nightmare Teacher 
 Real Beauty 
 Audition Truck 
 Don't Work Music 
 The Friends in Chiang Mai 
 The Friends in Switzerland 
 2014 BEAST Beautiful Show Behind Story 
 4minute's VIDEO 
 4minute's VIDEO special 
 BTOB Debut Showcase 
 Beast Special-concert highlights 
 BtoB's Mini Concert 
 BEAST zepp tour concert 
 2014 BEAST Beautiful Show 
 Yong jun hyung's GOOD LIFE 
 CLC's Beautiful Mission  
 The Friends in Croatia 
 Teen Top's Never stop in Guam 
 SISTAR's Midnight in Hong Kong 
 Cutie MV 
 Behind CUBE

General programs

 Live Power Music Special
 Live Power Music
 B+ Diary
 One cool day in BAP
 Snooper Project
 Gangnam Feel Dance School
 Very private TV
 The cornerstone of global dating 99
 Oh My Girl Cast
 Kiss and the City
 Star Q 10
 Best Chicken
 Cash Taxi Season 1
 The era of Fortress Exploration Tae Jae-hoon's Style Leave when you send! Between men! The Stage Big Pleasure Season 6 The Stage Big Pleasure Season 7 Idol Dance Competition D-style Half Moon I'm Kim So Jung Season 2 - Let's Go Hainan Weekly Idol Hyung-don and Dae-joon's Hitmaker Girl Spirit]]
 Hello IBI
 Infinite's Showtime
 Plan V Diary
 B1A4's One Fine Day
 When I Left
 Idol School
 Channel Fiesta
 Slimmy Lunch Box
 One fine day of Ailee&Amber
 Webtoon Hero Tundra Show Season 1
 Apink's Showtime
 Take 511
 Swedish Laundry
 A Week of Romance
 Immortal Songs: Singing the Legend
 Happy Together Season 3
 Battle Trip
 Let's Go! Dream Team Season 2
 Music Bank
 Music Bank World Tour
 Sistar's Showtime
 VIXX's One Fine Day
 Girl's Day - One Fine Day
 EXID's Showtime
 Heavenly Life Return
 Imaginary Cat (Drama)
 I Am Dating Alone (Variety)
 HARA ON&OFF: The Gossip
 AOA's One Fine Day
 Exo's Showtime
 Dodohara 
 Mash Up
 Rookie King: Channel Bangtan
 Fashion King Korea
 Coming Out FTIsland
 SONAMOO's Pet House
 I Order You (Drama)
 Lovelyz in Wonderland
 Star Show 360
 The Track
 Pentagon Maker
 Falling Skies (season 5) (Drama)
 MV Bank Stardust 2
 I Got7
 Lee Jung-ui's My Baby
 Hyuna's Free Month
 BtoB's Cool Men

References

External links
CUBE TV schedule

Cube Entertainment
IHQ (company)
Television channels in South Korea
Television channels and stations established in 2015
Korean-language television stations